TZ or tz may refer to:

Arts and media:
 The Twilight Zone, an American television anthology series
 Terezi Pyrope, a character from the webcomic Homestuck, frequently called "TZ" by her friend Sollux.
 Tz (newspaper), a German tabloid newspaper from Munich

Places:
 Tappan Zee Bridge, New York, US
 Tappan Zee High School, a public high school in Orangeburg, New York, US
 Tanzania (ISO 3166-1 alpha-2 country code TZ)

Science and technology:
 .tz, the country code top level domain (ccTLD) for Tanzania
 Time zone, a geographic region which uses a common clock time
 Tz database, also called zoneinfo or IANA Time Zone Database, a compilation of information about the world's time zones
 Saxitoxin, a chemical weapon with designation TZ in the US military 
 Sony Vaio TZ, a model of personal computer
 Transformation Zone, a term used in cervical cancer therapy, the area of the cervix where dysplasia and abnormal cell growth occur

Other uses:
 -tz, a digraph in linguistics, pronounced 
 ATA Airlines (1973-2008, IATA airline code TZ)
 Scoot (2012-present, IATA airline code TZ until 2017)